The 1951 Los Angeles State Diablos football team represented Los Angeles State College—now known as California State University, Los Angeles—as a member of the California Collegiate Athletic Association (CCAA) during the 1951 college football season. This was the first year of intercollegiate play for the school. Led by first-year head coach Leonard Adams, Los Angeles State compiled an overall record of 1–7 with a mark of 0–4 in conference play, placing last out of five teams in the CCAA. The team was outscored by its opponents 220 to 63 for the season and was shut out four times. The Diablos played home games at Los Angeles City College in Los Angeles.

Schedule

Notes

References

Los Angeles State
Cal State Los Angeles Diablos football seasons
Los Angeles State Diablos football